Craig Green (born 30 June 1964) is an Australian wrestler. He competed in the men's freestyle 74 kg at the 1984 Summer Olympics.

References

External links
 

1964 births
Living people
Australian male sport wrestlers
Olympic wrestlers of Australia
Wrestlers at the 1984 Summer Olympics
Place of birth missing (living people)